Lingo Cove, Delaware is a -wide cove in Rehoboth Bay at the mouth of Herring Creek in Sussex County, Delaware.

References

Bays of Sussex County, Delaware
Bays of Delaware
Coves of the United States